Dream On, an adult-themed sitcom created by David Crane and Marta Kauffman, aired on HBO from July 8, 1990, to March 27, 1996. The series aired for a total of six seasons, consisting of 120 episodes.

Series overview

Episodes

Season 1 (1990)

Season 2 (1991)

Season 3 (1992)

Season 4 (1993–94)

Season 5 (1994)

Season 6 (1995–96)

References

External links
 
 

Lists of American sitcom episodes